Takaomyia johannis is a species of Hoverfly in the family Syrphidae.

Distribution
Taiwan, Thailand, Japan.

References

Eristalinae
Insects described in 1914
Diptera of Asia